Jumpin' In is an album by bassist Dave Holland, recorded in 1983 and released on the ECM label. It features Holland with his quintet of trumpeter Kenny Wheeler, alto saxophonist Steve Coleman, trombonist Julian Priester and drummer Steven Ellington.
The album title has been used for the Manx Radio Friday night show Jumpin' In, presented by the brothers Caine.

Reception 
The AllMusic review by Scott Yanow awarded the album 4½ stars, stating, "Bassist Dave Holland leads one of his most stimulating groups on this superlative quintet date... This set, which has plenty of variety in moods, tone, colors, and styles, is one of Holland's better recordings".

Track listing
All compositions by Dave Holland except as indicated
 "Jumpin' In" - 7:41   
 "First Snow" - 6:28   
 "The Dragon and the Samurai" (Steve Coleman) - 8:25   
 "New-One" - 7:37   
 "Sunrise" - 5:26   
 "Shadow Dance" - 5:22   
 "You I Love" - 7:56  
Recorded at Tonstudio Bauer in Ludwigsburg, West Germany in October 1983

Personnel
David Holland — bass, cello
Steve Coleman — alto saxophone, flute
Kenny Wheeler — trumpet, pocket trumpet, cornet, fluegelhorn
Julian Priester — trombone
Steve Ellington — drums

References

External links

ECM Records albums
Dave Holland albums
1984 albums
Albums produced by Manfred Eicher